NCOA may refer to:

National Change Of Address database (see United States Postal Service)
National Chamber Orchestra of Armenia
National Council on Aging
 The Noncomissioned Officer Academy in the United States Air Force